The fifth season of Tyler Perry's House of Payne began airing on March 30, 2011, and ended on January 13, 2012. It stars LaVan Davis as Curtis Payne, Cassi Davis as Ella Payne, Allen Payne as CJ Payne, Lance Gross as Calvin Payne, Demetria McKinney as Janine Payne and Keshia Knight Pulliam as Miranda Payne. 

Actress Denise Burse has been reduced to a recurring role this season. Larramie "Doc" Shaw and China Anne McClain are featured in a low minimum number of episodes due to the shows they starred in Pair of Kings and A.N.T. Farm, respectively on Disney Channel and Disney XD.

Episodes

LaVan Davis appeared in all the episodes.
Cassi Davis was absent for four episodes.
Allen Payne was absent for seven episodes.
Demetria McKinney was absent for eight episodes.
Keshia Knight Pulliam was absent for ten episodes.
Lance Gross was absent for thirteen episodes.
Larramie "Doc" Shaw was absent for thirty episodes.
China Anne McClain was absent for thirty-four episodes.
Denise Burse makes a guest appearance in four episodes.

Tyler Perry's House of Payne seasons
2011 American television seasons
2012 American television seasons